Mirosław Widuch (born 29 December 1971 in Mikołów) is a Polish footballer who currently plays for Piast Gliwice.  Previously, Widuch spent 12 seasons with GKS Katowice appearing in more than 300 league matches for the club.

References
 

1971 births
Living people
Polish footballers
GKS Katowice players
Association football midfielders
People from Mikołów
Sportspeople from Silesian Voivodeship